The 2004 Canada Masters doubles was an event of the one hundred and fifteenth edition of the Canada Masters; a WTA Tier I tournament and the most prestigious men's tennis tournament held in Canada. Mahesh Bhupathi and Max Mirnyi were the defending champions. They were both present but did not compete together. Mirnyi partnered with Jonas Björkman, but Bhupathi and partner Leander Paes defeated them 6–4, 6–2, in the final.

Seeds
All seeds receive a bye into the second round.

Draw

Finals

Top half

Bottom half

External links
Association of Tennis Professionals (ATP) doubles draw

Canada Masters - Doubles